Jeremy Luke (born March 23, 1977) is an American actor, best known for his roles as Danny in Don Jon and as Mickey Cohen in the TNT series Mob City.

Early life
Luke was born and raised in Staten Island, New York. He attended the College of Staten Island and went on to have a successful career as a Night Club promoter. Luke first became an actor as a stress outlet and eventually made it his full profession. He has described his ancestry as "Puerto Rican, Italian, and Jewish".

Career
For the first decade of his career, Luke mostly had small guest roles in television series such as Judging Amy, NYPD Blue, ER, Las Vegas, and Desperate Housewives. He received his first major role in the Syfy television film Jersey Shore Shark Attack.

In 2013, he had a supporting role in Don Jon, which was directed by and starred Joseph Gordon-Levitt. He also played the role of Mickey Cohen in the TNT television series Mob City, which was created by director and writer Frank Darabont.

In 2019, he appeared in Martin Scorsese’s film, The Irishman, as Marco Rossi.

Luke also appeared as Paulie Lombardo in the 2020 action-adventure video game Mafia: Definitive Edition, a remake of the 2002 video game, where he also lent his voice, likeness and motion capture performance. Luke was also in the movie Poor Greg Drowning in 2020.

References

External links

1977 births
College of Staten Island alumni
Living people
Male actors from New York City
People from Staten Island
21st-century American male actors
American people of Italian descent
American people of Jewish descent
American people of Puerto Rican descent
American male film actors
American male television actors